Ona Munson (born Owena Elizabeth Wolcott; June 16, 1903 – February 11, 1955) was an American film and stage actress. She starred in nine Broadway productions and 20 feature films in her career, which spanned over 30 years.

Born and raised in Portland, Oregon, Munson began her stage career in New York theater in 1919, debuting on Broadway in George White's Scandals. She starred in another four Broadway plays and musicals before the end of the 1920s. In 1930, she moved to Los Angeles to embark on a career in film, but after appearing as leads in several films, such as Going Wild (1930) and The Hot Heiress (1931), she returned to Broadway, starring in several productions, including Henrik Ibsen's Ghosts (1935).

Munson resumed her film career in the late 1930s, and was cast as madam Belle Watling in David O. Selznick's Gone with the Wind (1939), a role which became her most famous. She starred in numerous films for Warner Bros. in the 1940s, but was often typecast based on her performance in Gone with the Wind, for instance in von Sternberg’s  The Shanghai Gesture (1941).

Munson married painter Eugene
 Berman in 1950, her second husband after a five-year marriage to director Edward Buzzell. She also had several documented affairs with women, including Alla Nazimova and playwright Mercedes de Acosta. Some commentators have considered her marriages as "lavender marriages", concealing Munson's homosexuality. By the mid-1950s, Munson was suffering from health complications following an unspecified surgical procedure, and frequently was using barbiturates. In February 1955, Berman found Munson dead in their Manhattan apartment, having committed suicide via a barbiturate overdose.

Life and career

1903–1918: Early life
Munson was born Owena Elizabeth Wolcott on June 16, 1903 in Portland, Oregon, the last of four children born to Owen Wolcott and Sally Wolcott (née Gore). All three of her elder siblings had died in infancy, leaving Munson the first surviving and only child. Munson was of French-Canadian heritage; her paternal grandmother immigrated from Quebec in 1865.

Munson was raised in Portland, where she attended the Catlin Gabel School (then known as Miss Catlin's School), and developed an affinity for English literature. Her parents divorced in the 1920s, and her father later remarried.

1919–1929: Broadway career
She first appeared on Broadway in a minor role in George White's Scandals, followed by a supporting part in Twinkle, Twinkle (both staged in 1919). In 1926, Munson took over the title role the singing and dancing ingenue Nanette in the original production of No, No, Nanette. On July 16, 1926, she married her first husband, fellow stage actor Edward Buzzell. The following year, she portrayed the title character in Manhattan Mary, followed by the female lead in 1928's original production of Hold Everything!, a musical in which she introduced the song "You're the Cream in My Coffee".

1930–1940: Move to Hollywood

Munson moved to Los Angeles in 1930, and appeared in the Warner Bros. movie Going Wild. Originally, this film was intended as a musical, but all the numbers were removed before release owing to the public's distaste for musicals, which virtually saturated the cinema in 1929–30. The following year, she divorced Buzzell. After the divorce, Munson had a brief affair with filmmaker Ernst Lubitsch before his marriage to Vivian Gaye.

Munson appeared the next year in The Hot Heiress, in which she sings several songs along with her co-star Ben Lyon. She also starred in Broadminded (1931) and Five Star Final (1931). After completing these films, Munson returned to New York and resumed her theater career, starring in Broadway productions of Hold Your Horses (1933), followed by Petticoat Fever and  Henrik Ibsen's Ghosts (both staged in 1935), in the latter of which she portrayed Regina Engstrand. During rehearsals for Ghosts, Munson had a short-lived romantic affair with actress Alla Nazimova, which ended before the play's premiere. Co-star Harry Ellerbe stated that the couple had "parted amicably."

 (1939)]]
Munson returned to Los Angeles in 1938 to appear a minor part in His Exciting Night, followed by an uncredited role in Dramatic School. When David O. Selznick began casting his production Gone with the Wind, he first announced that Mae West was to play Belle, but both West and Tallulah Bankhead refused the role as too small. Munson was the antithesis of the voluptuous Belle: freckled and of slight build—but Selznick cast her in the role.

Munson’s career was stalemated by the acclaim of Gone with the Wind; for the remainder of her career, she was typecast in similar roles. In 1940, Munson had an affair with playwright Mercedes de Acosta while working for Republic Pictures in Los Angeles. Their affair was intense, with Munson once writing to Acosta in a letter: "I long to hold you in my arms and pour my love into you."

1941–1955: Later years
She subsequently appeared as Chinese casino owner of dubious repute, Mother Gin Sling, in Josef von Sternberg's film The Shanghai Gesture (1941), in which she was "unrecognizable", presumably due to the ‘yellowface’ make-up created for her character and others for the film. During production, it was publicized that Munson had planned to marry Federal Housing agent Stewart McDonald. Though the couple ultimately did not marry, they remained romantically involved through 1942. Her last film was The Red House, released in 1947.

Munson's work on radio included co-starring (as Lorelei) with Edward G. Robinson on Big Town.

Munson married painter Eugene Berman on January 20, 1950 in Beverly Hills.

Death
Plagued by ill health stemming from an unnamed surgical procedure, Munson committed suicide at the age of 51 with an overdose of barbiturates in her apartment in The Belnord on Manhattan's Upper West Side. Her body was discovered by her husband Berman on the afternoon of February 11, 1955. A note found next to her bed read: "This is the only way I know to be free again... Please don't follow me." An autopsy determined that Munson had ingested the barbiturates between 4:00 a.m. and 6:00 a.m. on February 11.

She was interred at Ferncliff Cemetery in Hartsdale, New York. Munson posthumously received a star on the Hollywood Walk of Fame, located on the north side of the 6200 block of Hollywood Boulevard.

Posthumous speculations 
Billy Harbin and Kim Marra have termed Munson's marriages as "lavender marriages" intended to conceal her bisexuality and affairs with women.

Munson has been listed as a member of a group termed the "sewing circle", a clique of lesbians organized by actress Alla Nazimova, who was one of Munson's lovers.

Filmography

Stage credits

Notes and references

Notes

References

Sources

External links 

 
 
 Photos of Ona Munson from Shanghai Gesture, 1941 by Ned Scott
 Ona Munson papers, 1906–1949, held by the Billy Rose Theatre Division, New York Public Library for the Performing Arts
 

1903 births
1955 suicides
20th-century American actresses
20th-century American LGBT people
Actresses from Portland, Oregon
American film actresses
American musical theatre actresses
American people of French-Canadian descent
American radio actresses
American stage actresses
American television actresses
Catlin Gabel School alumni
Drug-related deaths in New York City
Drug-related suicides in New York City
Female suicides
American LGBT actors
LGBT people from Oregon
Vaudeville performers